Meerlo-Wanssum was a municipality in Limburg, the Netherlands.
The municipality ceased to exist as of January 2010.

Population centres 
Blitterswijck, now part of municipality: Venray
Geijsteren, now part of municipality: Venray
Meerlo, now part of municipality: Horst aan de Maas
Swolgen, now part of municipality: Horst aan de Maas
Tienray, now part of municipality: Horst aan de Maas
Wanssum, now part of municipality: Venray

External links
Official Website

Municipalities of the Netherlands disestablished in 2010
Former municipalities of Limburg (Netherlands)
Horst aan de Maas
Venray